Way Out is a 1967 drama film directed by Irvin Yeaworth and starring Franklin Rodríguez and Sharyn Jimenez.

Premise
The film follows the story of two men who become heroin addicts.

Cast
Franklin Rodríguez as Frankie
James Dunleavy as Jim
Sharyn Jimenez as Anita
Jerry Rutkin as Jerry
Starr Ruiz as Stella
Gilbert Mesa as Fats
Cecil White as Che Che
Louis Colon as Louie
Rudy Rosado as Rudy
John Gimenez as Pop

Production
Filming took place in Melrose, Bronx, New York City.

References

External links

1967 films
1967 drama films
1967 independent films
American drama films
American independent films
1960s English-language films
Films about heroin addiction
Films set in the Bronx
Films shot in New York City
Films directed by Irvin Yeaworth
1960s American films